KDR may refer to:
Kappa Delta Rho, an American college fraternity
The ISO 639-3 code for the Karaim language
Kinase insert domain receptor, a human protein
Short distance radio or KDR 444, Norway and Sweden
 KDR, IATA airport code of Kandrian Airport in Papua New Guinea
 Knockdown resistance of insects to pesticides 
 Radioplane KDR Quail, 1940s US target drone aircraft